Jean-Pierre Ferland is a self-titled album by Jean-Pierre Ferland, released in 1980.

Track listing 
All tracks written by Jean-Pierre Ferland except where noted.

Side one
Si Je Savais Jouer du Piano
Fer-à-Piton
Les Jambes
C'est ça l'Amour

Side two
Les Courtisanes
Chanson pour Félix
La Vie est Longue
A Quoi ça Sert d'être Millionaire
La Punk Rock (Chanson New Wave)

References

1980 albums
Jean-Pierre Ferland albums
French-language albums